The men's discus throw event at the 2019 European Athletics U23 Championships will be held in Gävle, Sweden, at Gavlehov Stadium Park on 13 and 14 July.

Medalists

Results

Qualification
Qualification rule: 58.50 (Q) or the 12 best results (q) qualified for the final.

Final

References

Discus
Discus throw at the European Athletics U23 Championships